The 2005–06 Nationalliga A season was the 68th regular season of the Nationalliga A, the main professional ice hockey league in Switzerland.

The season started on September 9, 2005, and the last league qualification game was played on April 17, 2006.

Regular season

Final standings

Scoring leaders

Note: GP = Games played; G = Goals; A = Assists; Pts = Points;  PIM = Penalty Minutes

Playoffs

Tournament Bracket

Quarterfinals Results

Semifinals Results

Finals Results

Scoring leaders

Note: GP = Games played; G = Goals; A = Assists; Pts = Points;  PIM = Penalty Minutes

Playout

Semifinals

Finals

League qualification

References 
sehv.ch
hockeystats.ch

Results from Puck.ch 
LNA Regular Season 2005-2006
Playoff 2005-2006
Playout 2005-2006
LNA/LNB League Qualification 2005-2006

External links 
hockeyfans.ch
spoor.ch

1
Swiss